Gerda Kordemets (real name Kulli-Kordemets, until 1982 Raud; born 25 June 1960 in Tallinn) is an Estonian theatre and film director, playwright, theatre critic, and culture journalist.

In 1986 she graduated from Tallinn Pedagogical Institute in stage managing speciality. From 1985 to 1993 she worked at Eesti Televisioon, being at several offices. From 1995 to 1996 she was the executive editor of the newspaper Pühapäevaleht and worked as a cultural journalist for Päevaleht, Eesti Päevaleht and Sõnumileht. From 1998 to 2011 she was the chief editor of Eesti Televisioon's cultural programs. Since 2011 she is a freelancer.

Filmography

 2007: Klass (feature film; II director)
 2008: Klass: elu pärast (television series; producer, director, scenarist)
 2012: Alpimaja (television series; director)
 2012: Süvahavva
 2019: Mehed

References

1960 births
Living people
Estonian theatre directors
Estonian women film directors
Estonian screenwriters
Estonian dramatists and playwrights
Estonian journalists
Tallinn University alumni
Writers from Tallinn